The Pakistan national cricket team toured Australia in the 1996–97 season and took part in the 1996–97 Carlton and United Series which they won after defeating West Indies in the final.

Pakistan played one first-class match on the tour against Tasmania at the Bellerive Oval.  Tasmania won by an innings and 69 runs.

External sources
 CricketArchive

References
 Wisden Cricketers Almanack 

1996 in Australian cricket
1996 in Pakistani cricket
1996–97 Australian cricket season
1997 in Australian cricket
1997 in Pakistani cricket
International cricket competitions from 1994–95 to 1997
1996-97